Several vessels have been named Dick:

 was a merchant ship built in 1788 in Rotherhithe, on the River Thames, England. She initially sailed as a West Indiaman. Her role and whereabouts between 1796 and 1810 are obscure. Later, she made two voyages as a troop transport, one to Ceylon and one to New South Wales. She then made one voyage transporting convicts to New South Wales. She was last listed in 1822.
 was a French vessel built in Spain, that the British captured circa 1798; she was almost certainly sailing under another name. Dick made a voyage to the West Indies during which she repelled two attacks, and captured three prizes. She then became a slave ship that made three slave-trading voyages. Her first voyage was cut short when a French privateer captured her and the Royal Navy recaptured her. She then made two compete voyages. After her return in 1803 from her third voyage she became a West Indiaman. She grounded in 1804 after being run foul off. She was last listed in 1809.

See also
 was launched at Bermuda in 1789. She sailed to England and was lengthened n 1792. From 1792 on she made two full voyages as a Liverpool-based slave ship. On her second she recaptured two British merchant ships. She was lost in 1796 at Jamaica after having landed her third cargo of slaves.

Ship names